Moebius: The Orb of Celestial Harmony is a video game produced by Origin Systems and designed by Greg Malone. It was originally released in 1985 for the Apple II. Versions were also released for the Amiga, Atari ST, Commodore 64, Macintosh, and MS-DOS. The game is primarily a top-down view tile-based role-playing video game, but it has action-based combat sequences which use a side view, roughly similar to games such as Karateka.

Origin Systems produced a sequel to the game, Windwalker.

Gameplay
The player's objective, as a disciple of the Headmaster, is to recover the Orb of Celestial Harmony from the disciple-turned-badguy Kaimen. To do that, the player must train his body and soul in the best tradition of Chinese warriors: to "walk the path of Moebius the Windwalker." The action takes place on the four Elemental planes of Earth, Water, Air and Fire, which the player must traverse in order to recover the Orb. Although gameplay is similar to standard RPGs, there are some differences: in addition to familiar character statistics such as dexterity, the players also has karma, a crucial attribute that goes up or down constantly depending on his deeds. Frighten a citizen with a sword, and the karma will drop; defeat monsters in battle, and it will rise. Combat is also played in a 2D side-scrolling view similar to fighting games, having a wide range of attacks to use, even including shurikens and fireballs if the character is experienced enough.

Reception
COMPUTE! called Moebius "yet another program worth raving about" from Origin, and a worthy followup to Ultima IV. It stated that the game had excellent graphics, "challenging and functional" arcade combat, and "many hours of enjoyment" from the puzzles. Computer Gaming World stated in 1986 that the game was "sort of an outgrowth or continuation of the best parts of Ultima with special emphasis on graphic detail ... The addition of a fully animated combat system was frosting on the cake". The magazine's Charles Ardai stated in 1987 that the martial-arts and RPG portions of Moebius "don't fit together very well, but each is individually enjoyable". Info gave the Commodore 64 version three stars out of five, stating that the "ambitious game ... has a decent storyline and the action is challenging". The magazine criticized Moebiuss "Apple conversionitis, with blocky graphics, jerky animation, and a clumsy keyboard user interface". The game was reviewed in 1989 in Dragon #141 by Hartley, Patricia, and Kirk Lesser in "The Role of Computers" column. The reviewers gave the game 4½ out of 5 stars.

Steve Fuelleman reviewed Moebius: The Orb of Celestial Harmony in Space Gamer/Fantasy Gamer No. 78. Fuelleman commented that "Overall, the game is excellent, in spite of the graphic animation and frustrations of play, or perhaps because of them. They lend an interesting flavor to the game and keep you on your toes. The graphics are good, and the animation doesn't overshadow the plot. This one is a gem, and the flaws only add a little more fire to it. Not only a must have, but probably one you would like."

References

External links
 Moebius at Atari Mania
 Moebius at Lemon Amiga
 
 

1985 video games
Adventure games
Amiga games
Apple II games
Atari ST games
Broderbund games
Commodore 64 games
DOS games
Classic Mac OS games
Origin Systems games
Role-playing video games
Video games developed in the United States
Single-player video games
Fantasy video games